Lake Seyfa is a lake in Kırşehir Province, central Turkey. It is a Ramsar site.

References

Seyfe
Landforms of Kırşehir Province
Ramsar sites in Turkey
Mucur
Important Bird Areas of Turkey